Netaji Nagar College (Evening), established in 1967, is an undergraduate college in Kolkata, West Bengal, India. It is affiliated with the University of Calcutta.

History 
The eventful career of the Netaji Nagar College began on 25 September 1967 with evening classes arranged in the premises of the Netaji Nagar Vidyamandir. Construction of the college building began within three years’ time. A corpus of fund to finance the building was created with a sum of one lakh and fourteen thousand rupees, quite a handsome amount by the standards of the time. People from all walks of life contributed to the fund. A measure of people's urge for making a success of the college can be had from the fact that the common man's small donations, of one or two rupees each, added up to quite a significant portion of the corpus. The institution has developed a distinctive identity of its own in the southern fringes of the city. It has been absolutely unrelenting in its efforts to reach out to the students of the area, especially the ones coming from the economically vulnerable sections of the society.

Accreditation 
NAAC- The college was accredited by the National Assessment and Accreditation Council in 2007 and re-accredited in 2016 with a B+ grade.

RUSA-The Rashtriya Uchhatara Shiksha Abhiyan grant was also received by the College.

Departments

Arts

 English
 Bengali
 History
 Geography
 Political Science
 Philosophy
 Education
 Economics
 Journalism and Mass Communication

See also 
Education in India
Education in West Bengal
Netaji Nagar Day College
Netaji Nagar College for Women
Netaji Nagar, Kolkata
List of colleges affiliated to the University of Calcutta

References

External links
Netaji Nagar College (Evening)

Educational institutions established in 1967
University of Calcutta affiliates
Universities and colleges in Kolkata
1967 establishments in West Bengal